Barstow may refer to:

People
 Barstow (surname)

Places
 In the United States
 Barstow, California, a city in San Bernardino County
 Barstow, Fresno County, California, an unincorporated community
 Barstow, Illinois
 Barstow, Maryland
 Barstow, Texas

 Elsewhere
 Bartstow, Alberta, a locality in Canada

Other uses
 The Barstow School, a private school in Kansas City, Missouri
 "Barstow", a musical work by Harry Partch

See also
 Bartow (disambiguation)